The Belco Party is a political party registered for the 2020 Australian Capital Territory general election. It was formally registered on 16 June 2020. It fielded five candidates in the Ginninderra electorate. It was founded by former Liberal Party Leader of the Opposition Bill Stefaniak.

References

Political parties in the Australian Capital Territory
Political parties established in 2020